Spiranthes magnicamporum, commonly called the Great Plains lady's tresses, is a species of orchid that is native to North America. It is primarily native in the Great Plains, but there are outlying populations in the east in areas of former natural grassland, such as the Black Belt prairies of the Southeast. It is found in both fens and wet and dry prairies, often in calcareous soil.

It is a perennial that produces a spiral of white flowers in the fall. It is closely related to the Spiranthes cernua complex, and it was not recognized as a separate species until the 1970s. S. magnicamporum can be distinguished by its much stronger scent, later flowering time, and lateral sepals that spread over the top of the flower.

References

magnicamporum
Flora of Canada
Flora of the Northeastern United States
Flora of the Southeastern United States
Flora of the North-Central United States
Flora of the South-Central United States
Orchids of the United States
Flora without expected TNC conservation status